Sveltia is a genus in the subfamily Cancellariinae  of the nutmeg sea snails with an extensive fossil range.

Fossil records
This genus is known in the fossil records from the Paleocene to the Pliocene (age range: from 55.8 to 2.588 million years ago). Fossils are found in the marine strata of the Dominican Republic, Ecuador, India, Italy, Mexico, Argentina, Belgium, Germany, Panama, Nigeria and United States.

Species
Species within the genus Sveltia include:
 † Sveltia alveata (Conrad, 1833) 
 † Sveltia caerulea Lozouet, 1999 
 † Sveltia castellum Lozouet, 2019 
 Sveltia centrota (Dall, 1896)
 † Sveltia alveata (Conrad, 1833) 
 † Sveltia caerulea Lozouet, 1999 
 † Sveltia castellum Lozouet, 2019 
 Sveltia gladiator (Petit, 1976)
 Sveltia lyrata (Brocchi, 1814)
 † Sveltia nemethi Kovács & Vicián, 2016 
 † Sveltia pyrenaica Peyrot, 1928 
 Sveltia rocroii Bouchet & Petit, 2002
 † Sveltia ruginosa Lozouet, 2019 
 † Sveltia salbriacensis Peyrot, 1928 
 Sveltia splendidula Bouchet & Petit, 2002
 † Sveltia suessi (Hoernes, 1875)
 † Sveltia varicosa (Brocchi, 1814) 
 † Sveltia varonei Lozouet, 2019 
 Sveltia yoyottei Petit & Harasewych, 2011
Synonyms
 † Sveltia aturensis Peyrot, 1928: synonym of † Tribia aturensis (Peyrot, 1928) (original combination)
 † Sveltia burdigalensis Peyrot, 1928: synonym of † Scalptia burdigalensis (Peyrot, 1928)
 † Sveltia calcarata (Brocchi, 1814): synonym of † Calcarata calcarata (Brocchi, 1814)
 † Sveltia castexi Peyrot, 1928: synonym of † Coptostoma castexi (Peyrot, 1928) (original combination)
 † Sveltia peyreirensis Peyrot, 1928: synonym of † Unitas peyreirensis (Peyrot, 1928) (original combination)

References

 Hemmen, J. (2007). Recent Cancellariidae. Annotated and illustrated catalogue of Recent Cancellariidae. Privately published, Wiesbaden. 428 pp.

External links
 Bold Systems
 Jousseaume F.P. (1887). La famille Cancellariidae (Mollusques Gastéropodes). Le Naturaliste. ser. 2, 9(13): 155-157

Cancellariidae
Paleocene gastropods
Neogene gastropods
Pliocene gastropods
Paleocene first appearances
Pliocene extinctions
Gastropod genera
Taxa named by Félix Pierre Jousseaume